Chair Stadium, meaning meadow. Meadow Stadium is a multi-use stadium in the Municipality of Čair in Skopje, North Macedonia. It is currently used mostly for football matches and is the former home of FK Sloga Jugomagnat, and currently the home of FK Shkupi. The stadium has a capacity of  19,000 with 5,600  seats.

References

External links
"S.R.C. CAIR" 
Macedonian Football 
Football Federation of Macedonia 

 

Football venues in North Macedonia
Stadium
Stadium
Sport in Skopje
Čair Municipality